Robert "Robbie" Bernard Lyn is a Jamaican session musician who plays piano, keyboard and synthesiser.

Biography
Robbie Lyn is a popular Jamaican session musician, who has played with various session/backing bands including Now Generation, Sound Dimension, Word, Sound and Power, and Sly and Robbie.  He has also backed and/or toured with many reggae artists, including Burning Spear, Peter Tosh, Dennis Brown and Third World.

Discography

Solo albums
 Making Notes (2007) – for which Lyn received the Reggae Academy Award for Best Instrumental Album, 2008.

Participated Albums
Never Ending by Beres Hammond (2018), VP Records - Keyboards

References

External links
 Robbie's MySpace page
 Listing of playing credits at Roots Archives
 Interview at Penthouse Records, 2009

1951 births
Living people
Musicians from Kingston, Jamaica
Jamaican session musicians
Jamaican male musicians
Jamaican reggae musicians
Jamaican pianists
21st-century pianists
21st-century male musicians